The 1996 Singapore Open was a tennis tournament played on indoor carpet courts in Singapore and was part of the World Series of the 1996 ATP Tour. The tournament ran from September 30 through October 6, 1996.

Champions

Men's singles

 Jonathan Stark defeated  Michael Chang 6–4, 6–4
 It was Stark's 2nd title of the year and the 16th of his career.

Men's doubles

 Todd Woodbridge /  Mark Woodforde defeated  Martin Damm /  Andrei Olhovskiy 7–6, 7–6
 It was Woodbridge's 11th title of the year and the 51st of his career. It was Woodforde's 12th title of the year and the 55th of his career.

Singapore Open
Singapore Open (men's tennis)
Singapore Open (tennis)
Singapore Open (tennis)
Singapore Open (tennis)